Monongalia County has been the name of two counties in the United States:
Monongalia County, West Virginia
Monongalia County, Minnesota, dissolved in 1871